Henning Schwarz (24 October 1928 – 13 April 1993) was a German politician of the Christian Democratic Union (CDU). He was interim Minister-President of Schleswig-Holstein during the Barschel affair.

Life 
Schwarz was born in Bad Oldesloe. His father was German CDU politician Werner Schwarz. Schwarz studied law in Würzburg and Hamburg, receiving a Doctor of Law in 1958. He then worked as a lawyer.

From 1971 to 1975 and from 1979 to 1987 he was member of the Landtag of Schleswig-Holstein. Since 1969, he served in various cabinet positions in the Schleswig-Holstein state government under Minister-Presidents Helmut Lemke, Gerhard Stoltenberg and Uwe Barschel, most of the time as Minister of Justice. In 1975, Stoltenberg named him Deputy Minister-President, a position which he kept after Barschel became Minister-President due to Stoltenberg being appointed Federal Minister of Finance.

After the 1987 Schleswig-Holstein state election, the CDU lost their absolute majority and the Barschel affair became public. Due to a deadlock in the Landtag and the affair, new elections were called for 1988. Barschel resigned on 2 October 1987 and later died on 11 October. Schwarz, as Deputy Minister-President, became Minister-President of Schleswig-Holstein on an interim basis until a new government was formed after the May 1988 election. He himself did not run in that election; CDU candidate for Ministers-President (Spitzenkandidat) instead was his Minister of Justice Heiko Hoffmann. The SPD won and Schwarz retired from politics.

Schwarz holds the distinction of being the longest-serving interim Minister-President of a German state, serving for the entire 11th legislative term, lasting about eight months. Most interim Minister-Presidents serve only for a few days (such as Michael Vesper in 2002 or Katharina Fegebank in 2018), some even for just one day on the grounds of constitutional technicalities (such as Jörg Bode in 2010 or Joachim Stamp in 2021). He is also the first and only interim Minister-President to lead his own cabinet, .

He was married and had three children. He died in Kiel.

Awards 
 1978: Order of Merit of the Federal Republic of Germany

External links 
 Parliament Schleswig-Holstein:Henning Schwarz (german)

Ministers-President of Schleswig-Holstein
Ministers of the Schleswig-Holstein State Government
Members of the Landtag of Schleswig-Holstein
Christian Democratic Union of Germany politicians
Grand Crosses with Star and Sash of the Order of Merit of the Federal Republic of Germany
1928 births
1993 deaths